Bertrand Marchand (born 27 April 1953) is a French former football player and manager.

Career
Marchand was coach-player then coach at Thouars Foot 79 from 1982 to 1997. Then he was at Stade Rennais F.C. (educator at the training center then assistant coach) and at En Avant de Guingamp (Ligue 1), where he directed the players of the first team of 2002 to 2004.

He also trained in Tunisia with Club Africain and ES Sahel, club based in Sousse with which, in 2007, he won the 2007 CAF Champions League and reached the semi-final of the 2007 FIFA Club World Cup in Japan. He is the only French to date, players and coaches combined, to have achieved this performance. Following this course, he received the UNECATEF trophy. He also won the 2008 CAF Super Cup.

At the end of his contract with the Etoile du Sahel, several clubs in the Persian Gulf began to take an interest in this technician, particularly the Al Wahda FC, which would do anything to get him signed. A second rumor sent him to Egyptian side Zamalek, but it was ultimately in Qatar, at Al-Khor whered he signed for two years.

In June 2010, he became the coach of the Tunisian national team. On 15 December 2010, the federal office of FTF decided to dismiss Bertrand Marchand after two defeats and a draw in CAN 2012 qualifying matches.

The Raja de Casablanca announced in September 2011 that it had recruited the Frenchman Bertrand Marchand for a renewable year as a new coach.

On 16 April 2015, he was appointed head of Al Gharafa, a Qatari football club based in Doha, for a period of one month following the dismissal of Marco Paqueta.

In September 2019, he was appointed new coach of the Chebbien3 Sports Crescent.

References

External links
 Bertrand Marchand Interview

1953 births
Living people
People from Dinan
Sportspeople from Côtes-d'Armor
French footballers
Footballers from Brittany
Association football defenders
Stade Rennais F.C. players
French football managers
En Avant Guingamp managers
Club Africain football managers
Étoile Sportive du Sahel managers
Al-Khor SC managers
Tunisia national football team managers
Raja CA managers
Umm Salal SC managers
Al Kharaitiyat SC managers
RS Berkane managers
Ligue 1 managers
French expatriate football managers
French expatriate sportspeople in Tunisia
Expatriate football managers in Tunisia
French expatriate sportspeople in Qatar
Expatriate football managers in Qatar
French expatriate sportspeople in Morocco
Expatriate football managers in Morocco
Botola managers